The 2012–13 Getafe CF season was the club's 30th season in its history and its ninth in La Liga.

Review and events

Competitions

Overview

La Liga

Copa del Rey

Round of 32

Round of 16

References

Getafe CF
Getafe CF seasons